Jacksonville City School District is a school district in Calhoun County, Alabama.

External links
 

School districts in Alabama